d
This is a list of the most-played college football series in NCAA Division I.  The Lehigh–Lafayette rivalry, known as "The Rivalry," is the most-played in Division I at 157 games. Lehigh and Lafayette are members of the Football Championship Subdivision (FCS). The most-played Football Bowl Subdivision (FBS) series is the Minnesota–Wisconsin football rivalry, at 132 games. In some cases, during the early years of college football when distant travel was prohibitive, these teams played each other more than once per year. 

Series listed here are not necessarily continuous series, and several of the series listed below were ended (or interrupted) by either the 2010–2014 NCAA conference realignment or the COVID-19 pandemic. It also includes several games that are not considered notable rivalries, but are between teams that, mainly due to conference alignment, have been played 100 or more times. Most of the games are in-conference match-ups. Nevertheless, conference affiliation is not necessarily an impediment to playing an annual game, and this list features match-ups of teams that have rarely or never shared an athletic conference. 

This table is for listing all NCAA Division I football series with at least 100 games played. Wins and losses are given respective to the team leading the series.

Games
Updated through January 8, 2023
The "V" column indicates vacated victories to make sure all the games are documented in the list - W+L+T+V=Total. Vacated victories are different than forfeited victories. In recent years, the NCAA has used the vacating procedure instead of requiring forfeitures when teams are penalized for violating NCAA rules. NCAA procedures require that the winning team adjust its record to remove a win that is vacated. However, the losing team is not allowed to reduce the number of losses on its record. This means that the win–loss–tie records for some series will not add up to the total number of games without adding the vacated games in the V column. Confounding this problem is that the NCAA's official record of the most played rivalries, does not reflect the vacated games. A note documenting each vacated game is included in the "V" column.

See also
 List of NCAA college football rivalry games

Notes

References 
Specific references

General references. Vacated games are not treated consistently with NCAA's own rules for reporting in these publications and the lists have missing games.
 The NCAA Division I FBS record book: 
 The NCAA Division I FCS record book: 

College football-related lists